Love is Waiting may refer to:

"Love Is Waiting" (Crispy song), 1998
"Love Is Waiting", song by Sérgio Mendes from Sérgio Mendes
"Love is Waiting", song by Cindy Morgan from Elementary
"Love is Waiting", song by Al Jarreau from Jarreau
"Love is Waiting", song by Kylie Minogue from Kylie Minogue